Lukens may refer to:

People
 Anna Lukens (1844-1917), American physician
 Buz Lukens (1931–2010), American politician
 Charles Lukens (1786-1825, British businessman
 Dennis Lukens (born 1952), American soccer coach
 Glen Lukens (1887–1967), American ceramicist and jeweler
 Lewis Lukens (born 1963), American diplomat
 Rebecca Lukens (1794–1854), American businesswoman
 Theodore Lukens (1848–1918), American conservationist

Other
 Assured Neace Lukens, insurance brokerage
 Lukens Historic District, Pennsylvania
 Lukens Steel Company
 Mount Lukens, California
 The King v. Lukens, Pennsylvania lawsuit

See also
 Luken
 Lukin